Haq is a 2010 Malaysian action-drama film directed by CL Hor and Jumaatun Azmi. The film follows two brothers with both good and evil powers, who must either overcome or succumb to their own demons when they finally confront each other.

Plot
Haq and Bad are Tuan Haji Ibrahim's adopted brothers. Haq is endowed with power and is capable of removing objects with the power of the mind. Unlike Haq who has good personality and wisdom, Bad is more rebellious and stubborn. To Bad's stubbornness, their mother died before their eyes. After adulthood, Bad likes to be friends with thugs as opposed to Haq who continues his studies.

Cast
Zul Huzaimy as Haqim "Haq" Ibrahim
Adi Putra as Badrul "Bad" Ibrahim
Nanu Baharuddin as Zahra
Raja Farah as Aina
Fatimah Abu Bakar as Mak Lang
Zulkifli Ismail as Tuan Haji Ibrahim
Ammar Adli Bin Mohamed Norin as young Haq
Amirul Adli Bin Mohamed Norin as young Bad

References

External links

2010 films
2010 action drama films
Malay-language films
Malaysian action drama films